is a large park and garden in Shinjuku and Shibuya, Tokyo, Japan. It was originally a residence of the Naitō family in the Edo period. Afterward, it became a garden under the management of Japan Imperial Household Agency. It is now a national park under the jurisdiction of the Ministry of the Environment.

History 
The shōgun bequeathed this land to Lord Naitō (daimyō) of Tsuruga in the Edo period who completed a garden here in 1772. After the Meiji Restoration the house and its grounds were converted into an experimental agricultural centre. It then became a botanical garden before becoming an imperial garden in 1879. The current configuration of the garden was completed in 1906. Most of the garden was destroyed by air raids in 1945, during the later stages of World War II. The garden was rebuilt after the war.

The jurisdiction over the Imperial Palace Outer Garden and the Kyoto imperial garden was transferred to the Ministry of Health and Welfare (now the Ministry of Health, Labour and Welfare) in 1947.

On May 21, 1949, the garden became open to the public as a national park. It came under the jurisdiction of the Ministry of the Environment in January 2001, with the official English name "Shinjuku Gyoen National Garden". The official Japanese name remains Shinjuku Gyoen, where gyoen means "imperial garden".

In 1989, the Shinjuku Gyoen was the site chosen for the funeral rites of Emperor Shōwa before he was buried at the Musashi Imperial Graveyard.

Features

The garden, which is 58.3 hectares in area with a circumference of 3.5 km, blends three distinct styles: a French Formal and English Landscape in the north and to the south a Japanese traditional. A traditional Japanese tea house can be found within the gardens. The garden is a favourite hanami (cherry-blossom viewing) spot, and large crowds can be present during cherry blossom season.

Flora
The garden has more than 20,000 trees, including approximately 1,500 cherry trees which bloom from late March (Shidare or Weeping Cherry) to early April (Somei or Tokyo Cherry), and on to late April (Kanzan Cherry). Other trees found here include the majestic Himalayan cedars, which soar above the rest of the trees in the park, tulip trees, cypresses, and plane trees, which were first planted in Japan in the Imperial Gardens.

Horticulture work has been happening in the garden greenhouses since 1892. The present greenhouse, built in the 1950s has a stock of over 1,700 tropical and subtropical plant species on permanent display.

Entrances and admission
The garden has three access gates: Shinjuku Gate, Okido Gate, and Sendagaya Gate. Shinjuku Gyoen is open from 9:00 until 17:30 (Mid-March until End of September; October–Mid-March: until 16:00; July–late August: 18:30). On Mondays the garden is closed, except during the cherry blossom and chrysanthemum seasons: late March–late April, and first half of November respectively, when the garden is open seven days a week. If Monday is a public holiday, then closed the following day. During cherry blossom, prior reservations are required for several dates. The greenhouse is open from 9:30 until 17:00 (Mid-March until End of September; October–Mid-March: until 15:30; July–late August: 18:00).

Location
The garden is a short walk from Shinjuku-gyoemmae Station on the Marunouchi Line or Sendagaya Station on the Chūō-Sōbu Line. The garden is on the Tokyo Metro Fukutoshin Line near Shinjuku-sanchōme Station. From that station (exit C1) the garden is a four-minute walk.

In popular culture
In Yasunari Kawabata's The Sound of the Mountain, Shingo declares, "You can stretch out. It's like getting out of Japan - I wouldn't have dreamed that there was a place like this right in the middle of Tokyo."

It is the setting of the 2013 anime film The Garden of Words.

References

Bibliography

External links 

 Shinjuku Gyoen official website (English)

Gardens in Tokyo
Hanami spots of Japan
Parks and gardens in Tokyo
Shibuya
Shinjuku